Rab Nong Sayong Kwan (a.k.a. Scared) is a 2005 Thai horror film directed by Pakphum Wonjinda. In this movie, a group of freshmen on a road trip survive an accident, only to end up in an abandoned town where they are hunted down and killed one by one.

Cast 
Sumonrat Wattanaselarat as Pii May
Wongthep Khunarattantrat as Jonathan
Kanya Rattanapetch as Tarn
Amornpan Kongtrakarn as Mew
Atchara Sawangwai as Awm
Kenta Tsujiya as Kenta
Buanphot Jaikanthaa as Mai
Chatchawan Sida as Bawmp
Matika Arthakornsiripho as Tan

External links 
 

2005 films
Sahamongkol Film International films
Thai horror films
Thai slasher films